Gorak may refer to:

Górak, a surname
Gorak, Iran (disambiguation), any one of several places with the same name

People with the surname
Chris Gorak, American film director

See also
 
 Garak (disambiguation)